Skálmöld is a Viking / folk metal band from Reykjavík, Iceland, formed in August 2009. The band's name is literally translated as Age of Swords and also means "lawlessness", referring to the Age of the Sturlungs of Icelandic history, when a civil war broke out between the country's family clans.

History

Snæbjörn Ragnarsson and Björgvin Sigurðsson, who have been friends since childhood and have played together in various collectives, including death metal and punk bands, decided to start a new metal band, Skálmöld, formed in August 2009 in Reykjavík. The other band members had also been active in the Icelandic music scene. Initially, the band was intended to be merely a hobby, but the members soon decided to record an album before they were "too old and tired".  
After contacting most of the Icelandic labels—to no avail—the band was signed by the Faroese label Tutl in November 2010, which released the band's debut album Baldur in Iceland and the Faroe Islands. In April 2011, the band signed a record deal with Napalm Records; Baldur was re-released worldwide the following August.

The deal with Napalm gave Skálmöld a significant popularity boost. The band was invited to participate in the Wacken Open Air festival and the Heidenfest 2011 tour.

On April 13, 2012, Skálmöld began recording its second album, Börn Loka, which was released in October the same year.

In November, 2013, Skálmöld played a series of concerts with the Iceland Symphony Orchestra at the Harpa concert hall in Reykjavík. A live album and accompanying video, Skálmöld & Sinfóníuhljómsveit Íslands, was released on 18 December 2013.

The next studio album was Með vættum, released in 2014, which tells the story of a woman who encounters enemies in the north, east, south and west of Iceland, and is assisted by mythological beings. In 2016 Skálmöld released Vögguvísur Yggdrasils, an album themed around the different worlds of Norse cosmology. It was followed by Sorgir in 2018, which tells four tragic stories, each from two different perspectives.

The band's official book, The Saga Of Skálmöld, was published in 2021. It was written by British author Joel McIver and featured a foreword by President of Iceland Guðni Th. Jóhannesson.

Musical style
From the beginning, Skálmöld's intention has been to combine the sounds of the traditional Icelandic music and metal. Initially, the band planned to use a lot of folk instruments, but soon decided to scale back and have three guitar players instead. The band's influences include such metal bands as Metallica, Iron Maiden, Anthrax, Slayer, Amon Amarth and Ensiferum, as well as Jón Leifs, the classical Icelandic composer. Skálmöld's lyrics, written by Snæbjörn entirely in Icelandic, are inspired by the Norse mythology and Icelandic sagas. Furthermore, the lyrics conform to some of the Old Norse poetic forms, including fornyrðislag and sléttubönd.

All the band members are members of the heathen organisation Ásatrúarfélagið. Jón Geir Jóhannsson explained the way they believe in the Norse gods: "You shouldn't personify them. It's not people, it's stories that represent human nature. So yes, the ethics are there, but we don't believe in them as 'persons'."

Discography

Studio albums
2010: Baldur 
2012: Börn Loka 
2014: Með vættum
2016: Vögguvísur Yggdrasils
2018: Sorgir

Live albums 
2013: Skálmöld & Sinfóníuhljómsveit Íslands
2020: 10 Year Anniversary - Live in Reykjavík

Singles
2013: "Innrás"

Members
 Björgvin Sigurðsson – vocals, guitar
 Baldur Ragnarsson – guitar, vocals
 Snæbjörn Ragnarsson – bass, vocals
 Þráinn Árni Baldvinsson – guitar, vocals
 Gunnar Ben – oboe, keyboard, vocals
 Jón Geir Jóhannsson – drums, vocals

Gallery

References

External links 
Official web-site
Official MySpace
Official Facebook

 

Icelandic heavy metal musical groups
Musical groups established in 2009
Viking metal musical groups
Napalm Records artists
2009 establishments in Iceland
Folk metal musical groups
Modern pagan musical groups
Modern paganism in Iceland
Musical groups from Reykjavík